Font-rubí is a municipality in the comarca of Alt Penedès, Barcelona, Catalonia, Spain. Its capital is the village of Guardiola de Font-rubí.

References

External links
 Government data pages 

Municipalities in Alt Penedès